Benjamin Franklin's phonetic alphabet was Benjamin Franklin's proposal for a spelling reform of the English language. The alphabet was based on the Latin alphabet used in English.

The alphabet
Franklin modified the standard English alphabet by omitting the letters c, j, q, w, x, and y, and adding new letters to explicitly represent the open-mid back rounded and unrounded vowels, and the consonants [ʃ], [ŋ], [ð], and [θ]. It was one of the earlier proposed spelling reforms to the English language. 

The alphabet consisted of 26 letters in the following order:

Other English phonemes are represented as follows:
 is represented as hu (as in huɥi for why).
 is represented as ɥi (as in ɥiz for eyes).
 is represented cɩu (as in hcɩus for house).
 is represented dի (as in edի for age).
, at the time more probably , is represented as ee or e (as in leet for late or kes for case).
 is represented as eer (as in keer for care or ᷄ⱨeer for their).
 is represented as ii or i (as in ſtriim for stream).
 is represented cɩɥi (as in distrcɩɥi for destroy).
 is represented cɩr (as in fcɩrget for forget).
, at the time separate, is represented or (as in kors for course).
 is represented tի (as in tիit for cheat). 
 is represented zի (as in mezիɥr for measure).
Unstressed vowels are generally represented by the letters used to represent their stressed equivalents. What today is considered a schwa is mostly represented with ɥ, although whenever spelled in standard English with a, Franklin maintains the symbol a.

Vowels

Franklin's proposed alphabet included seven letters to represent vowels. This set consisted of two new letters, in addition to five letters from the existing English alphabet: a, e, i, o, u. The first new letter was formed as a ligature of the letters o and a, and used to represent the sound  (as written in IPA).

However, these distinctions appear not perfectly identical to the distinctions today; for example, the only word shown to use cɩcɩ is the word all, but not other words that in modern notation would use . This discrepancy may reflect Franklin's own inconsistencies, but, even more likely, it reflects legitimate differences in the English phonology of his particular time and place.

In his examples of writing in the proposed alphabet, Franklin contrasts long and short uses of his letter e, with the words "mend" and "remain", respectively spelled in Franklin's system as "mend" and "remeen". In this system, the doubled "ee" is used to represent the  sound in "late" and "pale". Likewise, "ii" is used to represent the  sound in "degrees", "pleased", and "serene". One of Franklin's correspondences written in the new alphabet is inconsistent in this regard, representing the  sound in "great" and "compared" with the accented letter "ê" instead of "ee".

Franklin does not appear to make a distinction between the modern  and  phonemes, which likely reveals another difference between eighteenth-century English pronunciation versus modern pronunciation.

Consonants
Franklin's proposed alphabet included nineteen letters to represent consonants. This set consisted of four new letters, in addition to fifteen letters from the existing English alphabet: b, d, f, g, h, k, l, m, n, p, r, s, t, v, z. New letters were proposed to replace the English digraphs ng, sh, voiced th, and voiceless th. New consonant digraphs based on these new letters were used to represent the affricate sounds of ch in cherry and j in January.

The most influential of Franklin's six new characters appears to have been the letter eng, for "ng".  It was later incorporated into the IPA.  Alexander Gill the Elder had used this letter in 1619.

References

External links
Article on Omniglot
Franklin writing about his alphabet
Benjamin Franklin’s Phonetic Alphabet at Smithsonian.com, 10 May 2013

Benjamin Franklin
English spelling reform
Phonetic alphabets